Mathew Waters is an American sound engineer. He has won six Primetime Emmy Awards and has been nominated for four more in the category Outstanding Sound Mixing. In 2022, Waters won a Primetime Emmy Award for his work on the television program Only Murders in the Building, sharing the win with Lindsey Alvarez, Alan DeMoss and Joseph White Jr.

References

External links 

Living people
Place of birth missing (living people)
Year of birth missing (living people)
American audio engineers
20th-century American engineers
21st-century American engineers
Primetime Emmy Award winners
American sound editors